Y-Films is an Indian film production and distribution company, based in Mumbai. The company is a subsidiary of Yash Raj Films.

History
The company was launched on 1 April 2011 by Aditya Chopra, who revealed that Yash Raj Films would create a new film studio, Y-Films, and concentrate on introducing fresh talent.

The event saw promotional material released for three future productions, with Ashish Patil being announced as chief producer.

Filmography

Production

Films

Web series

References

Film distributors of India
Film production companies based in Mumbai
Entertainment companies established in 2011
Hindi cinema